Rezvan (also Romanized as Reẕvān and Rezvān) is a village in Tabadkan Rural District, in the Central District of Mashhad County, Razavi Khorasan Province, Iran. At the 2006 census, its population was 856, in 243 families.

References 

Populated places in Mashhad County